Big Omaha is a locality of the Auckland Region, sited some 8km southwest from Leigh. There is a trail from Matakana to Pakiri Beach.

References 

Populated places in the Auckland Region
Matakana Coast